Erik Ole Bye (20 March 1883 – 17 May 1953) was a Norwegian operatic baritone. He studied singing with Morgenstierne in Oslo, zur Muhlen in London and R. Willani in Paris. He also competed at the Olympics as a rower.

Biography
He competed in the men's eight event at the 1908 Summer Olympics.

He made his professional opera debut in 1913 at the National Theatre in Oslo as Don Basilio in Gioachino Rossini's The Barber of Seville. From 1914 to 1917, he was a member of the Breslau Opera House; making his debut there as Amonasro in Giuseppe Verdi's Aida. In 1917 he sang with the Opéra-Comique in Paris. In November 1918 he sang the role of the High Priest in Camille Saint-Saëns's Samson and Delilah for the opening of the new opera house in Oslo. From 1921–1932 he was primarily active with opera companies and orchestras in North America. He returned to Norway in 1932 where he continued to perform and worked as a businessman. He made recordings for Columbia Records, His Master's Voice, and the Victor Talking Machine Company. His son, Erik Bye, was a prominent Norwegian journalist and singer.

References

External links
 
 

1883 births
1953 deaths
Norwegian operatic baritones
Norwegian expatriates in England
Norwegian expatriates in France
Norwegian expatriates in Germany
Norwegian expatriates in the United States
20th-century Norwegian male opera singers
Norwegian male rowers
Olympic rowers of Norway
Rowers at the 1908 Summer Olympics
Musicians from Drammen